Sachse is a city in Collin and Dallas counties in the U.S. state of Texas and is part of the DFW metroplex. An eastern suburb of Dallas, the city population was 20,329, as of the 2010 census with an estimated population of 26,046 people today.

History
Sachse was founded by William Sachse, a European immigrant from  Herford, Prussia (included modern-day Germany, and parts of Poland and Eastern Europe), in 1845. Purchasing  from Collin County, Sachse erected the first cotton mills and gins in the county. After Sachse gave 100 feet of frontage through all of his holdings to the railroad in 1886, the railroad built a depot on the frontage and named the town Sachse. Since the depot was labeled 'Saxie', many old legal documents referred to the city as 'Saxie'. The flaw was later corrected. The word Sachse comes from the German word for Saxon.

Geography
Sachse is located at  (32.976433, -96.586138).

Education
Sachse residents living in Dallas County attend schools in Garland Independent School District. Sachse residents living in Collin County attend schools in Wylie Independent School District.

Armstrong Elementary School, Sewell Elementary, Hudson Middle School, and Sachse High School serve Garland ISD within Sachse city limits. Garland ISD has a "choice-of-school" system that allows any student in the district to attend any school.

Cox Elementary School and Whitt Elementary School serve Wylie ISD within Sachse city limits. Wylie ISD has feeder school system in which each school feeds into the next school. Cox Elementary feeds into Harrison Intermediate School, Burnett Junior High School, and Wylie East High School and Whitt Elementary School feeds into Draper Intermediate School, Cooper Junior High School, and Wylie High School. All the secondary schools are located within the city of Wylie.

Residents in Dallas County are zoned to Dallas College (formerly the Dallas County Community College District or DCCCD). Residents in Collin County are zoned to Collin College.

Demographics

As of the 2020 United States census, there were 27,103 people, 8,736 households, and 6,806 families residing in the city.

Government
Incorporated in 1956, the City of Sachse adopted its Home Rule Charter in 1986 and is served by the North Central Texas Council of Governments.  The city council is composed of a mayor and six (6) council members.  Each is elected at-large, serving 3-year staggered terms with no term limits.  Operating under a Council-Manager form of government, Sachse is a full-service city.

References

External links
 City of Sachse official website
 Sachse Chamber of Commerce
 Sachse Economic Development Corporation
 Sachse Historical Society

Cities in Texas
Cities in Collin County, Texas
Cities in Dallas County, Texas
Dallas–Fort Worth metroplex